Kenneth Robert Howard (September 7, 1929–September 19, 1992), also known as Dutch, Von Dutch, or J. L. Bachs (Joe Lunch Box), was an American motorcycle mechanic, artist, pin striper, metal fabricator, knifemaker and gunsmith.

Early life
As the son of a sign painter, Howard learned to letter and pinstripe professionally by the age of 10. While attending Compton High School, Howard excelled in track and field and was referred to as "the fastest man in LA." Family members gave him the nickname "Dutch" because he was "as stubborn as a Dutchman," he added the "Von" prefix later as an artistic signature.

Work
Howard started earning money in the 1950s by pin-striping along with fellow striper Dean Jeffries. Von Dutch has been a major influence in the customizing of vehicles from the 1950s to today.  Some of his famous works include the flying eyeball logo and the custom Kenford truck, along with numerous custom motorcycles and many award-winning custom cars. Among many custom car and motorcycle enthusiasts, he is thought of as one of the fathers of Kustom Kulture. In fact, Von Dutch created the K in KUSTOM, a nod to his affection for German esthetics.

An avid gunsmith and knife maker, Von Dutch made numerous art knives and embellished firearms. Most of these were adaptations of existing items to which he added his artistic flair. In 1958, Von Dutch designed and produced the "Mare's Leg", a cut-down Winchester rifle for the television series Wanted: Dead or Alive.

Von Dutch completed pin striping the well-known "Blue Velvet" Pontiac Firebird in 1979, which is complete with two perfectly parallel pin stripes  feet long down each side of the vehicle. These pin stripes were completed by hand and attained a level of perfection that gave rise to the legend of Von Dutch as a pin striper.

Death
Von Dutch's lifelong alcoholism led to major medical issues later in life. He died on September 19, 1992, from alcohol-related complications, leaving behind his two daughters, Lisa and Lorna. His ashes were scattered in the Pacific Ocean.

Von Dutch Originals, LLC 

After his death, his daughters created a clothing line because Dutch left all his prized possessions to the Bruckers. His daughters only sold the clothing rights "Von Dutch" name to Michael Cassel and Robert Vaughn. In 2009 Tonny Sorensen, then CEO of Von Dutch, sold the company to Groupe Royer, a French footwear company.

Racism and anti-sociality 
In January 2004, an OC Weekly article alleged Howard's violent and racist tendencies. Robert Williams, a friend and fellow artist, said Howard was "...quite a racist; didn't like anybody. Howard was accused of having all the trappings of being a neo-Nazi. Another accusation suggested he could not tolerate black people." The article alleges that a letter written shortly before Howard's death in 1992, when he was in the hospital, closed with “Bye, Heil Hitler.” After the publication of the article, a number of retailers removed Von Dutch from their inventory despite its profitability.

In May 2004, Los Angeles Magazine profiled Howard similarly, describing his alcoholism and anti-social behaviour. Von Dutch clothing founder Ed Boswell described Howard as "...as an avid military enthusiast enamored of German Military esthetics. But he was not a white power guy. He hated everybody too much to be one of those. He was a provocateur."

See also
Hot rod
Ed Roth

References

Further reading

External links
 A documentary of the life of Kenneth Howard, a.k.a. Von Dutch 
 
 Rumpsville's Kenneth Howard Page

1929 births
1992 deaths
People from Los Angeles County, California
American artists
Motorcycle builders
Vehicle modification people
Kustom Kulture artists
Gunsmiths